The Amazing Mr. Malone (also known as Murder and Mr. Malone) is an American radio crime drama series based on the John Malone series of mystery novels by Craig Rice. The series began on ABC in 1948 and was broadcast on NBC Radio in 1951.

Characters and story
Socialite John Joseph Malone (Gene Raymond, George Petrie, Frank Lovejoy) is a tough Chicago criminal lawyer who takes on a new case in each episode. Malone never gives up until justice is done. Gene Wang wrote for the program.

The Malone character first appeared in the book Eight Faces at Three in 1939. The Amazing Mr. Malone was developed by Bernard L. Schubert.

Television
The series had a brief television run from September 24, 1951 to March 10, 1952 on ABC, with Lee Tracy in the title role. The TV series was sponsored by the Seiberling Rubber Company of Akron, Ohio and was seen alternately with Mr. District Attorney.

References

External links
Jerry Haendiges Vintage Radio Logs
 

American radio dramas
Detective radio shows
1948 radio programme debuts
1951 radio programme endings
1940s American radio programs
1950s American radio programs
ABC radio programs
NBC radio programs
American Broadcasting Company original programming
Radio programs adapted into television shows
1950s American drama television series
American crime drama television series
English-language television shows
Television shows based on American novels
1951 American television series debuts
1952 American television series endings
Black-and-white American television shows